Dr. Jeppiaar (11 June 1931 – 18 June 2016), also known as J. P. R., was an Indian politician, educationist, and industrialist. He was born in Muttom near Nagercoil, Travancore Cochin Presidency, now the Kanyakumari District, Tamil Nadu.

He obtained his Bachelor of Law (B.L.) from Madras University and his PhD from Anna University. He was the founder and chairman of Jeppiaar Educational Trust and he was the founder and chancellor of the Sathyabama University. He was also the president of the Consortium of Professional, Arts and Science Colleges of Tamil Nadu.

He is one of the pioneers in the privatization of engineering education in Tamil Nadu. His net worth was estimated at  3,000 crore in 2016.

Early life
Jeppiaar was born in a Mukkuvar RC Christian family. His father was Jesuadimai and mother Panimalar Ammal, after whom he named the Panimalar educational institutions. He was said be a close associate of M. G. Ramachandran.

Political career
During Dr. M. G. Ramachandran's regime, he acted as the Government chief whip of the Tamil Nadu Legislative Council. He also served as the Secretary of the Chennai District AIADMK party from 1972 to 1987 and was a special envoy to the Chief Minister.
 The chairman of Madras Water Supply and Sewerage Board (Metro Water).
 Honorary services as Elected Member of Legislative Council
 Director of Tamil Nadu Fisheries Development Corporation.

Death 
On 18 June 2016, he died shortly after experiencing breathlessness, sometimes rarely between 8.30 PM and 8.45 PM Indian Standard Time IST. He was rushed to the emergency ward of Global Hospital at around 8.50 PM, Perumbakkam, where he was declared dead upon arrival. He was aged 85, at the time of death. Funeral of Jeppiaar took place at Sathyabama University, Chennai on 19 June 2016 and was attended by students, teachers, politicians, film personalities and people from different walks of life; and he was laid to rest at the entrance portion of the university.

Launch of memorial museum 
As a tribute to him, a memorial museum was set up and inaugurated in the premises of sathyabhama university on 17 June 2017. The museum is an artistic tribute to him, and was launched a day before his first death anniversary, by Dr. Regeena Jeppiaar. This museum is the first of its kind in India, which has been exclusively dedicated for an educationist. It has a collection of his various portraits, depicting his life and achievements in many fields such as academic, cultural, and social circles from his childhood till demise amongst his personal things. The whole work of the museum was designed by the artist Mr. A. P. Sridhar. Several dignitaries from cinema and educational fields attended and inaugurated the museum.

Filmography

As producer

As actor

References

People from Kanyakumari district
1931 births
2016 deaths
20th-century Indian educational theorists